In geometry, the order-6 square tiling is a regular tiling of the hyperbolic plane. It has Schläfli symbol of {4,6}.

Symmetry 
This tiling represents a hyperbolic kaleidoscope of 4 mirrors meeting as edges of a square, with six squares around every vertex. This symmetry by orbifold notation is called (*3333) with 4 order-3 mirror intersections. In Coxeter notation can be represented as [6,4*], removing two of three mirrors (passing through the square center) in the [6,4] symmetry. The *3333 symmetry can be doubled to 663 symmetry by adding a mirror bisecting the fundamental domain.

This bicolored square tiling shows the even/odd reflective fundamental square domains of this symmetry. This bicolored tiling has a wythoff construction t1{(4,4,3)}. A second 6-color symmetry can be constructed from a hexagonal symmetry domain.

Example artwork 
Around 1956, M.C. Escher explored the concept of representing infinity on a two-dimensional plane. Discussions with Canadian mathematician H.S.M. Coxeter inspired Escher's interest in hyperbolic tessellations, which are regular tilings of the hyperbolic plane. Escher's wood engravings Circle Limit I–IV demonstrate this concept. The last one Circle Limit IV (Heaven and Hell), (1960) tiles repeating angels and devils by (*3333) symmetry on a hyperbolic plane in a Poincaré disk projection.

The artwork seen below has an approximate hyperbolic mirror overlay added to show the square symmetry domains of the order-6 square tiling. If you look closely, you can see one of four angels and devils around each square are drawn as back sides. Without this variation, the art would have a 4-fold gyration point at the center of each square, giving (4*3), [6,4+] symmetry.<ref>Conway, The Symmetry of Things (2008), p.224, Figure 17.4, [http://www.mcescher.com/Gallery/recogn-bmp/LW436.jpg Circle Limit IV] </ref>
 

 Related polyhedra and tiling 

This tiling is topologically related as a part of sequence of regular polyhedra and tilings with vertex figure (4n).

This tiling is topologically related as a part of sequence of regular tilings with order-6 vertices with Schläfli symbol {n,6}, and Coxeter diagram , progressing to infinity.

See also

Square tiling
Uniform tilings in hyperbolic plane
List of regular polytopes

References

 John H. Conway, Heidi Burgiel, Chaim Goodman-Strass, The Symmetries of Things'' 2008,  (Chapter 19, The Hyperbolic Archimedean Tessellations)

External links 

 Hyperbolic and Spherical Tiling Gallery
 KaleidoTile 3: Educational software to create spherical, planar and hyperbolic tilings
 Hyperbolic Planar Tessellations, Don Hatch
 GenusView 0.4 preview View of {4,6} hyperbolic tiling, and matching 3D torus surface.

Hyperbolic tilings
Isogonal tilings
Isohedral tilings
Order-6 tilings
Regular tilings
Square tilings